Centipeda cunninghamii is a species of flowering plant in the Asteraceae family. It is referred to by the common names old man weed, being the literal translation of its Koori name gukwonderuk, common sneezeweed and scent weed which were given by European settlers but are increasingly falling out of use. The plant was used by indigenous Australians for its purported medicinal properties.  It grows along the Murray River, or generally anywhere there is water, especially low lying or swampy areas. It can be identified by its unique shaped leaf and its pungent scent which is pine-like and minty.

Etymology
Centipeda is from the Greek word for one hundred feet  The epithet cunninghamii honours Allan Cunningham (1791 – 1839), an English botanist and explorer, primarily known for his travels to Australia (New South Wales) and New Zealand to collect plants and author of Florae Insularum Novae Zelandiae Precursor, 1837-40 (Introduction to the flora of New Zealand).

Characteristics
Centipeda cunninghamii is an erect or ascending, endemic Australian perennial herb of the Daisy family (Asteraceae), glabrous or rarely woolly, about 20 cm (8 inches) high; stems much-branched.

Leaves: Oblong to more less spathulate, they are about 15 mm (1/2 inch) long and 3–4 mm (1/10 inch) wide; margins shallowly toothed or subentire; narrowed to base but petiole indistinct.

Inflorescence: Tiny green globular flowers, that can also be green, red/pink. Heads sessile, usually solitary, ± globose to biconvex, 4–8 mm (1/5 inch) in diameter; involucral bracts ± obovate, 2–3 mm long, apex obtuse, minutely toothed. Female florets usually 6–8-seriate. Bisexual florets 10–30.

Fruit: Achenes clavate, about 2 mm long, apex rounded and glabrous above ribs.

Ecology
Flowering: mostly spring–autumn. September - February

Fruiting: October - June

Distribution and occurrence: Usually grows in damp areas subject to flooding, on a range of soil types. All subdivisions except NC; all mainland States, New Zealand. New South Wales subdivisions: CC, SC, NT, CT, ST, NWS, CWS, SWS, NWP, SWP, NFWP, SFWP Other Australian states: Qld Vic. Tas. W.A. S.A. N.T. Centipeda cunninghamii has also been encountered in Europe, most likely as a result of inadvertent introduction.

Habitat: Coastal to montane (up to 600 m a.s.l.). Especially common in muddy/sility ground left by receding waters along lake, pond, stream and river margins. Also in muddy hollows within rough pasture, paddocks, tussock grassland, in damp depressions within dune swales and sometimes in similar sites within urban areas.

Propagation Technique: Easily grown from fresh seed and cuttings. Inclined to become invasive.

Traditional uses
Centipeda cunninghamii has a long history of traditional use by Australian Aboriginals for wounds, infections and inflammation. Traditional methods of use most commonly involve binding leaves of the plant directly to the forehead or other parts of the body, so that body heat may release the plants oils which are then absorbed into the skin. It may also be taken orally, sometimes mixing it with emu fat or boiling/soaking it in water to create a tea. In cases of oral ingestion, traditional medicinal authorities have cautioned to carefully regulate the dosage as the plant may be toxic if taken in large amounts.

References

Further reading
 
 
 
 

Athroismeae
Asterales of Australia
Flora of New South Wales
Flora of the Northern Territory
Flora of Queensland
Flora of South Australia
Flora of Tasmania
Flora of Victoria (Australia)
Eudicots of Western Australia
Flora of New Zealand
Medicinal plants of Oceania
Medicinal plants of Australia
Plants described in 1867
Taxa named by Augustin Pyramus de Candolle
Taxa named by Alexander Braun
Taxa named by Paul Friedrich August Ascherson